The Cedar City Temple is a temple of the Church of Jesus Christ of Latter-day Saints in Cedar City, Utah, United States. The intent to construct the temple was announced by church president Thomas S. Monson on April 6, 2013, during the church's semi-annual general conference.  The temple was announced concurrently with the Rio de Janeiro Brazil Temple; at the time, the announcement brought the total number of temples worldwide to 170.  It is the 17th temple to be built in Utah.

On August 8, 2015, L. Whitney Clayton presided at a groundbreaking to signify the beginning of construction. A public open house was held from October 27 through November 18, 2017, excluding Sundays. The temple was dedicated on December 10, 2017 by Henry B. Eyring.

In 2020, along with all the church's other temples, the Cedar City Utah Temple was closed in response to the coronavirus pandemic.

See also

 The Church of Jesus Christ of Latter-day Saints in Utah
 Comparison of temples of The Church of Jesus Christ of Latter-day Saints
 List of temples of The Church of Jesus Christ of Latter-day Saints
 List of temples of The Church of Jesus Christ of Latter-day Saints by geographic region
 Temple architecture (Latter-day Saints)

References

External links

 Cedar City Utah Temple Official site
 Cedar City Utah Temple at ChurchofJesusChristTemples.org

Temples (LDS Church) in Utah
Buildings and structures in Cedar City, Utah
21st-century Latter Day Saint temples
Religious buildings and structures completed in 2017
2017 establishments in Utah